Panchavatee Jayamangala Panchamukha Sri Anjaneyaswamy  is a temple located 9 km from Pondicherry, India.

The temple is situated near Pondicherry, in the village of Pappanchavadi, Vanur Taluk, Villupuram Dist

References

Hindu temples in Viluppuram district
Hindu temples in Puducherry